Jeffrey Bradford Scott (born December 28, 1980) is an American football coach. He was the head coach at the University of South Florida from 2020 to 2022.

Playing career
Born in Arcadia, Florida, Scott later lived in Seneca, South Carolina and graduated from the Hammond School in Columbia, South Carolina in 1999. He played quarterback on the football team and was also an outfielder and pitcher on the baseball team in high school. Scott played college football at Clemson University under head coach Tommy Bowden.  He lettered three years (2000–2002) as a wide receiver. He also played special teams for most of his playing career, serving as the holder for place kicks. He participated in three bowl games while playing at Clemson: the 2001 Gator Bowl, 2001 Humanitarian Bowl, and 2002 Tangerine Bowl.

Coaching career

Early career 
Scott started his coaching career as the head football coach for Blythewood High School in Blythewood, South Carolina in 2006. He won a state title in his first and only year, at age 25. This was Blythewood's football program's inaugural year as well. It is believed to be the first time in South Carolina high school football history that a first-year head football coach led his program to a state title in its first year of fielding a team. After one year coaching at the high school level, he then served as wide receivers coach for the Presbyterian Blue Hose in 2007.

Clemson 
He made his return to Clemson in 2008 as a graduate assistant on Tommy Bowden's staff. When Dabo Swinney took over as interim head coach midway through the 2008 season he was promoted to coach wide receivers, the position that had been held by coach Swinney. He was promoted to head of recruiting in December 2008 when Dabo Swinney was given the full-time position. In December 2014, he was named co-offensive coordinator to replace outgoing offensive coordinator Chad Morris, who left to take over as head coach of the SMU football program. He shared coordinator duties with Clemson's running back's coach and former teammate, Tony Elliott. Former Clemson teammate Brandon Streeter was hired to take over recruiting coordinator duties as well as to coach quarterbacks.

Clemson's football team won the national championship in January 2017, beating Alabama, with Scott and Elliott as offensive coordinators for the game.

University of South Florida 
Scott was hired as the fifth head coach in University of South Florida history on December 9, 2019, becoming the youngest head coach in The American. He signed a five-year deal worth $12.5 million dollars. In his inaugural game as head coach, the Bulls beat the Citadel 27-6. Despite this early victory, the Bulls lost their remaining games and ended the season 1-8.

In 2021, Scott and the Bulls won only two games, defeating Florida A&M 38-17 and Temple 34-14. Following the season, Scott received a two-year contract extension. Athletic director Michael Kelly cited continuity as key to the future success of the program in this decision.

Throughout Scott's three seasons as head coach, he holds a 4-26 record, with three of four wins coming against FCS programs. The lone win against an FBS opponent was against a three-win Temple team in 2021. , his win percentage ranks last in program history amongst head coaches. South Florida fired Scott on November 6, 2022. Special teams coordinator Daniel Da Prato took over as interim head coach.

Head coaching record

Personal life 
Scott graduated with a bachelor's degree in secondary education from Clemson University in 2003. He is married to the former Sara McDaniel. He is the son of Brad Scott, former South Carolina Gamecocks football head coach and longtime Clemson assistant coach. His younger brother, John Scott, who Jeff often refers to as his "hero", is a trauma surgeon who trained at Harvard and at Harborview Medical Center in Seattle, and is now an assistant professor of surgery at the University of Michigan.

References

External links
 Clemson profile

1980 births
Living people
American football wide receivers
Clemson Tigers football coaches
Clemson Tigers football players
Presbyterian Blue Hose football coaches
South Florida Bulls football coaches
High school football coaches in South Carolina
People from Arcadia, Florida
people from Seneca, South Carolina
Players of American football from Florida
Players of American football from South Carolina
Coaches of American football from South Carolina
Coaches of American football from Florida